Isaac Mendes Belisario (1795 – 1849) was a Jamaican artist of Jewish descent. He was active in Kingston, Jamaica around the time of the Emancipation. His painting and printing work provides an eye-witness document of life in Jamaica of the time. He is one of the earliest artists who took a Jamaica-centric approach to the island's culture. His portfolio includes the lithograph Sketches of Character, In Illustration of the Habits, Occupation, and Costume of the Negro Population in the Island of Jamaica, which was published in collaboration with the lithographer Adolphe Duperly in 1837–38, documents activities of the former slaves immediately after the emancipation. Some prints are the earliest visual representation of the masquerade of John Canoe.

References 

Jamaican artists
Jamaican Jews
Jewish artists
1795 births
1849 deaths